Shor in the City is a 2011 Indian Hindi-language crime drama film directed by Raj Nidimoru and Krishna D.K., and produced by Ekta Kapoor and Shobha Kapoor starring Tusshar Kapoor, Sendhil Ramamurthy, Preeti Desai, Girija Oak, Radhika Apte, Nikhil Dwivedi, Pitobash Tripathy, Sundeep Kishan (in his Hindi debut) and Amit Mistry.

The background score of the film was composed by Roshan Machado. The first look of the film was unveiled on 21 March 2011 while the film was released in India on 28 April 2011.

Plot
Five prominent personalities in the city Mumbai are the focus of the film. Tilak (Tusshar Kapoor) is a small-time publisher of unlicensed books along with his friends Mandook (Pitobash Tripathy) and Ramesh (Nikhil Dwivedi). They kidnap a famous author and force him to give the manuscript of his latest book to them so that they will be the first ones to publish it.

Abhay (Sendhil Ramamurthy) is a NRI who returns to India to start his own small business and meets Shalmili (Preeti Desai).

Sawan (Sundeep Kishan) is a young cricketer hoping to break into the under-22 Mumbai cricket team. The story focuses on their trials and tribulations as they battle life in the city of Mumbai during the chaotic period of the festival Ganesh Chaturthi.

The film attempts to address topics such as chance, the never-ending conflict between hope and despair, and self-actualization. The film begins with the song "Karma is a bitch," which fits with the major concept of the movie, in which the characters struggle to come to terms with their own actions. Abhay has a horrible past that isn't disclosed in the movie, but it's possible that he traveled to India to escape it. Tilak initially holds himself responsible for the injury of the child due to the bomb explosion that happens in the movie which brings him closer to his wife and views life from a different perspective. The goons who traumatized Abhay eventually end up being shot by their own bullets on the day of Ganesha Visarjan.

Tilak gets a new life and finds his treasure at home. Sawan gives up the money he finds at the bank robbery and instead focuses on improving his game for cricket selections and gets support from Sejal (Sawan's partner) too. Ramesh is seen applying for jobs and Mandook is protesting at a rally. Towards the end of the movie, all characters move on different paths.

Cast
 Tusshar Kapoor as Tilak
Sendhil Ramamurthy as Abhay
 Nikhil Dwivedi as Ramesh
 Preeti Desai as Shalmili
 Sundeep Kishan as Sawan "Sawi" Murthy
 Pitobash as Mandook
 Radhika Apte as Sapna
 Girija Oak as Sejal
 Amit Mistry as Tipu
 Zakir Hussain as Extortionist

Production
Shor in the City was made on a small budget of ₹3 Crore and a further ₹2.75 crore on P&A, with total investment coming to around ₹6 crore. Trade analysts estimated that around 50% of this will be recovered from non-theatrical revenue but as always it is the theatrical revenue that decides a film's fate at the box office.

Balaji Motion Pictures, head of distribution and acquisition Girish Johar says "We gave Shor in the City a tight release of around 500 screens across the country and the film found appreciation. It grossed around ₹3.85 crore in just 4 days and adding the revenue from non-theatrical rights, the whole investment on the film has been more than recovered."

Reception

Box office
Shor in the City nett. grossed ₹2.89 crore in India. Shor in the City also opened poorly at around 10–15% in 475 cinemas(500 screens) in India. It was estimated that the film has advantage of low costs which should be recovered but theatrical business may not be much.⁣

Critical response
The film was well received by critics.

Nikhat Kazmi of The Times of India awarded it four stars out of five and stated "With a zany screenplay (Raj Nidimoru and Krishna DK), excellent cinematography by Tushar Kanti Ray and peppy music by Sachin-Jigar, Shor in the City is another breaking-norm film from Ekta Kapoor".

Taran Adarsh of Bollywood Hungama gave it three and a half stars and wrote "Shor in the City belongs to one of those rare categories of movies with sensibilities that would not only entice the festival crowd and the cinema literate, but also lure the ardent moviegoer."

Aniruddha Guha of the Daily News and Analysis gave it three stars and said "Shor in the City is the kind of reassuring film you yearn to watch amid, well, what 'Bollywood' has to offer every week. Also, it articulates something you have only probably thought before – 'Karma IS a bitch.'"

Rajeev Masand of CNN-IBN awarded three and a half stars saying "A delicious mix of quirky humor, gruesome violence, and surprising sensitivity, Shor in the City works on the strength of its smart script and consistent performances from its ensemble cast."

Rediff awarded the film four stars and said "Raj-Krishna's Shor in the City robotically registers itself in Indian cinema's history."

Anupama Chopra of NDTV gave the movie four stars and wrote "Shor in the City is a terrific film. It’s surprising and disturbing and has a vein of rich, dark humor coursing through it."

Shubhra Gupta of the Indian Express gave it a three star rating and commented "What makes Shor in the City an instant clutter-breaker is its darkly comic treatment. It makes you smile because its humour comes from within. It’s not grafted. And it’s got heart : we feel for the characters."

Tushar Joshi of MiD DAY gave it a four star rating and wrote "Loaded with humor, sarcasm and wit. That truly is the beauty of the makers who succeed in arresting you with their tales. The spectacular climax is easily one of the best written in recent times."

Karan Anshuman of Mumbai Mirror gave it a four star rating, saying "Three stories, eleven days, myriad layers, believable characters, fine performances, spirited direction, taut script, momentary explosions of originality."

Awards
Shor in the City was officially selected for the Busan International Film Festival and the Dubai International Film Festival in 2010. The film won the Best Director Award for Raj Nidimoru and Krishna DK at MIAAC in New York.

Soundtrack
The songs are composed by Sachin–Jigar

. Two songs from Harpreet were taken from his Sufi compilation called Teri Justujoo released by Sony in 2008. Lyrics are penned by Sameer and Priya Panchal. Shor in the City Soundtrack Tops The Charts in few days. The song Karma Is a Bitch is influenced from Ida Maria's Bad Karma.

Track listing

Bonus tracks

References

External links

2010 films
2010s Hindi-language films
2010s buddy comedy films
2010s crime comedy-drama films
Films set in Mumbai
Films shot in Mumbai
Indian buddy comedy films
Indian crime comedy-drama films
Balaji Motion Pictures films
2010 comedy-drama films
Films directed by Raj Nidimoru and Krishna D.K.